Events from the year 1807 in the United States.

Incumbents

Federal Government 
 President: Thomas Jefferson (DR-Virginia)
 Vice President: George Clinton (DR-New York)
 Chief Justice: John Marshall (Virginia)
 Speaker of the House of Representatives: Nathaniel Macon (DR-North Carolina) (until March 4), Joseph Bradley Varnum (DR-Massachusetts) (starting October 26)
 Congress: 9th (until March 4), 10th (starting March 4)

Events

 February 10 – The United States Coast Survey is established; work begins on August 3, 1816.
 February 19 – Burr conspiracy: Former Vice President of the United States Aaron Burr is arrested on charges of treason. He is accused of plotting to annex parts of Louisiana and Mexico to become part of an independent republic.
 March 2 – The U.S. Congress passes an act to "prohibit the importation of slaves into any port or place within the jurisdiction of the United States....from any foreign kingdom, place, or country" (to take effect January 1, 1808).
 May 22 – A grand jury indicts Aaron Burr for treason.
 July 1 – Pike Expedition ends.
 August 17 – The Clermont, Robert Fulton's first American steamboat, leaves New York City for Albany, New York, on the Hudson River, inaugurating the first commercial steamboat service in the world.
 September 1 – Aaron Burr is acquitted of treason.
 December 22 – The U.S. Congress passes the Embargo Act.

Births
 January 6 – Joseph Holt, 25th United States Secretary of War and Judge Advocate General of the United States Army during the Lincoln assassination trials (died 1894)
 January 11 – Ezra Cornell, founder of Western Union and co-founder of Cornell University (died 1874)
 January 19
 Robert M. Charlton, United States Senator from Georgia from 1852 till 1853 (died 1854)
 Robert E. Lee, General of the Army of Northern Virginia during the American Civil War (died 1870)
 February 3 – Joseph E. Johnston, Confederate Army general (died 1891)
 February 16 – Lysander Cutler, Union general (died 1866)
 February 25 – George Trenholm, 2nd Confederate States Secretary of the Treasury (died 1876)
 February 27 – Henry Wadsworth Longfellow, poet and professor (died 1882)
 March 1 – Wilford Woodruff, 4th President of the Church of Jesus Christ of Latter-day Saints (died 1898)
 April 24 – Charles Ferguson Smith, Union Army major general (died 1862)
 May 1 – John B. Magruder, Confederate Army major general (died 1871)
 June 24 – John Pettit, United States Senator from Indiana from 1853 to 1855 (died 1877)
 June 25 – Edward A. Hannegan, United States Senator from Indiana from 1843 to 1849 (died 1859)
 July 12 – Silas Casey, Union Army major general (died 1882)
 August 11 – David Rice Atchison, United States Senator from Missouri from 1844 till 1855 (died 1886)
 August 18 – Charles Francis Adams Sr., United States Minister to the United Kingdom, son of John Quincy Adams (died 1886)
 September 25 – Alfred Vail, machinist and inventor (died 1859)
 October 17 – Stephen Adams, United States Senator from Mississippi from 1852 till 1857 (died 1857)
 October 30 – James S. Wadsworth, Union Army general (died 1864)
 December 14 – Francis Gillette, United States Senator from Connecticut from 1854 till 1855 (died 1879)
 December 17 – John Greenleaf Whittier, poet and abolitionist (died 1892)

Deaths

 March 4 – Abraham Baldwin, United States Senator from Georgia from 1799-1807 (born 1754)
 May 13 – Eliphalet Dyer, jurist and statesman, delegate to the Continental Congress (born 1721)
 May 17 – John Gunby, Maryland soldier in the American Revolutionary War (born 1745)
 November 24 – Joseph Brant, Mohawk military and political leader (born 1743)
 November 26 - Oliver Ellsworth, 3rd Chief Justice of the Supreme Court (born 1745)
 Full Date Unknown - Eliphalet Chapin, furniture designer (born 1741)

See also
Timeline of United States history (1790–1819)

Further reading
 S. Godon. Mineralogical Observations, Made in the Environs of Boston, in the Years 1807 and 1808. Memoirs of the American Academy of Arts and Sciences, Vol. 3, No. 1 (1809), pp. 127–154
 Benjamin Silliman, James L. Kingsley. Memoir on the Origin and Composition of the Meteoric Stones Which Fell from the Atmosphere, in the County of Fairfield, and State of Connecticut, on 14 December 1807; In a Letter, Dated February 18, 1808, from Benjamin Silliman, Professor of Chemistry in Yale College, Connecticut, and Mr. James L. Kingsley, to Mr John Vaughan, Librarian of the American Philosophical Society. Transactions of the American Philosophical Society, Vol. 6, (1809), pp. 323–345
 Herbert E. Bolton. Papers of Zebulon M. Pike, 1806–1807. The American Historical Review, Vol. 13, No. 4 (July, 1908), pp. 798–827
 Thorp Lanier Wolford. Democratic-Republican Reaction in Massachusetts to the Embargo of 1807. The New England Quarterly, Vol. 15, No. 1 (March, 1942), pp. 35–61
 Anthony Steel. Impressment in the Monroe-Pinkney Negotiation, 1806–1807. The American Historical Review, Vol. 57, No. 2 (January, 1952), pp. 352–369
 Vincent Freimarck. Rhetoric at Yale in 1807. Proceedings of the American Philosophical Society, Vol. 110, No. 4 (August 23, 1966), pp. 235–255
 Henry A. Boorse. Barralet's "The Dunlap House, 1807," and Its Associations. Pennsylvania Magazine of History and Biography, Vol. 99, No. 2 (April, 1975), pp. 131–155
 William G. McLoughlin. Thomas Jefferson and the Beginning of Cherokee Nationalism, 1806 to 1809. The William and Mary Quarterly, Third Series, Vol. 32, No. 4 (October, 1975), pp. 548–580
 Richard R. Beeman. Trade and Travel in Post-Revolutionary Virginia: A Diary of an Itinerant Peddler, 1807–1808. The Virginia Magazine of History and Biography, Vol. 84, No. 2 (April, 1976), pp. 174–188
 Jeffrey A. Frankel. The 1807–1809 Embargo Against Great Britain. The Journal of Economic History, Vol. 42, No. 2 (June, 1982), pp. 291–308
 John M. Bryan. Robert Mills, Benjamin Henry Latrobe, Thomas Jefferson, and the South Carolina Penitentiary Project, 1806–1808. The South Carolina Historical Magazine, Vol. 85, No. 1 (January, 1984), pp. 1–21
 George Ehrlich. The 1807 Plan for an Illustrated Edition of the Lewis and Clark Expedition. The Pennsylvania Magazine of History and Biography, Vol. 109, No. 1 (January, 1985), pp. 43–57
 John Taylor, Wilson Cary Nicholas, David N. Mayer. Of Principles and Men: The Correspondence of John Taylor of Caroline with Wilson Cary Nicholas 1806–1808. The Virginia Magazine of History and Biography, Vol. 96, No. 3, "The Example of Virginia Is a Powerful Thing": The Old Dominion and the Constitution, 1788–1988 (July, 1988), pp. 345–388
 H. R. DeSelm. Vegetation Results from an 1807 Land Survey of Southern Middle Tennessee. Castanea, Vol. 59, No. 1 (March, 1994), pp. 51–68
 Matthew E. Mason. Slavery Overshadowed: Congress Debates Prohibiting the Atlantic Slave Trade to the United States, 1806–1807. Journal of the Early Republic, Vol. 20, No. 1 (Spring, 2000), pp. 59–81

External links
 

 
1800s in the United States
United States
United States
Years of the 19th century in the United States